Triuggio is a comune (municipality) in the Province of Monza and Brianza in the Italian region Lombardy, located about  northeast of Milan. It contains the Villa Jacini a Zuccone Robasacco, a cultural heritage site in private ownership.

References

External links